Bannec or Banneck, Banneg in Breton (from the Breton bann, "horn", a term often used for sharp summits) is an uninhabited French island in the Iroise Sea close to the city of Brest in Brittany. It is situated at the northwestern end of the Molène archipelago, 4 km (2.5 miles) from the island of Ushant. This island is part of the Parc naturel régional d'Armorique and Parc naturel marin d'Iroise.

Description
Located two kilometers northwest of the island of Balanec and four kilometers (2.5 miles) northwest of the island of Molène. Bannec has an area of eleven acres and is 800m long by 200m wide (2600 by 650 feet). The island is extended by Ledenez Banneg, an island connected to the main island of Bannec at low tide, but is separated from it at high tide. To the south, the island of Bannec is extended by two islands: Enez-Kreiz and Roc'h-Hir. The lighthouse Kéréon is on a nearby island called Men Tensel ("snarling stone"), in the Fromveur Passage between Bannec and Ushant. Rocky shores predominate, but the south-east coast is a low coast consists of sand and pebbles.

Populated by a large number of birds, Bannec is prohibited to all visitors, except to authorized personnel on scientific missions.

History

20th Century
In 1918, the islands Bannec and Balanec were well described by a traveler as follows:

Description of Bannec in 1930
Pierre Bouis, who visited the islands in the archipelago of Mullein in August 1930, described Bannec in the journal Ouest-Éclair

Description of Bannec in 1938 
André Salmon, in the journal Le Petit Parisien, describes Bannec in 1938:

After World War II 
Until the World War II, like its neighbors, Bannec was inhabited by seaweed harvesters. One building remains, which was in ruins after the war, but was restored in 1979, this cabin is now inhabited by Bernard Fichaut noted geomorphologist, as part of an observatory of the famous "blocs cyclopéens de Bannec" (Cyclops Rocks of Bannec).

Bannec was owned by the family of Huon Penanster before it was sold to the company NOEL, which was dissolved on 10 April 1964}. Following a declaration of public utility, the island was purchased by the Department of Brittany in 1971. Bannec was incorporated into the Parc naturel régional d'Armorique on 30 September 1969 and the Finistere department entrusts management to the SEPNB, now known as Bretagne vivante (Brittany Alive) in October 1976.

References

Regional natural parks of France
Islands of Brittany
Landforms of Finistère
Uninhabited islands of France